Annielie Gerez Pamorada (born January 8, 1992), better known as Pamu Pamorada, is a Filipina actress and comedian from Lipa, Batangas.

Biography
She was abandoned by her parents in her childhood. She started her career in showbusiness after she won as the 2nd Big Placer of Pinoy Big Brother: Unlimited on Day 155. Since then, she has made some guest appearances in different television programs and teleseries in ABS-CBN.  Her biggest break came in 2014, when she was given a major supporting role as the best friend of Kathryn Bernardo's character in the blockbuster film, She's Dating the Gangster.

Filmography

Television

Online

Movies

References

External links
 
 
 

1992 births
Living people
Star Magic
Pinoy Big Brother contestants
People from Lipa, Batangas
Actresses from Batangas